The 2010 Asian Men's Youth Handball Championship (4th tournament) took place in Abu Dhabi from 3 July–15 July. It acts as the Asian qualifying tournament for the 2011 Men's Youth World Handball Championship in Argentina.

Draw

* Following the IOC decision to suspend the NOC of Kuwait which came in force on 1 January 2010, the International Handball Federation decided to suspend handball in Kuwait in all categories.

Preliminary round

Group A

Group B

Placement 5th–10th

9th/10th

7th/8th

5th/6th

Final round

Semifinals

Bronze medal match

Gold medal match

Final standing

References

External links
www.handball.jp
www.goalzz.com
www.asianhandball.org

International handball competitions hosted by the United Arab Emirates
Asian Mens Youth Handball Championship, 2010
Asia
Asian Handball Championships